E. P. Jayarajan (born 28 May 1950) is an Indian politician from the state of Kerala. He was the Minister for Industries and Sports in the Pinarayi Vijayan Ministry. He is elected to the Kerala Legislative Assembly from Mattanur constituency in Kannur district and is a member of the Communist Party of India (Marxist). He completed his Diploma in Electrical Engineering.

Political career
He was the first All India President of D.Y.F.I. (Democratic Youth Federation of India) and was the General Manager of the CPI(M) party mouthpiece Deshabhimani. He was the President of Kerala Karshaka Sangham and Central Committee Member of Communist Party of India (Marxist).

He was a Member of Kerala Legislative Assembly from 1991 to 1996 and 2011 to 2021. On 25 May 2016, he took oath as the Minister for Industries and Sports under the new Kerala Cabinet led by Pinarayi Vijayan. On 14 October 2016, he resigned over nepotism following allegations that he appointed his own family members as heads of public sector undertakings in the state. In September 2017, the Vigilance and Anti-Corruption Bureau (VACB) acquitted Jayarajan in the nepotism case and sought to close the case.

References

External links

 E.P. Jayarajan MLA

1950 births
Living people
Communist Party of India (Marxist) politicians from Kerala
Kerala MLAs 2016–2021
People from Kannur district